Yann Perreau (born 1976) is a Canadian singer songwriter from Quebec specialising in rock-electro music. Between 1994 and 1999, he was a member of Doc et les Chirurgiens, before becoming a solo artist.

Biography

Beginnings
Yann Perreau grew up in a musical oriented family. His parents ran a bar that invited many well-known names to perform at the venue. He took part in a province wide college musical competition Cégeps en spectacle in 1994.

Doc et les Chirurgiens
At 18, he joined guitar player David Blais and drummer Steve Cournoyer to form the band Doc et les Chirurgiens, band based in Lanaudière, Quebec but with pan-provincial success. In its first year of formation, the trio won the Quebec music competition Cégeps Rock and the L'Empire des futures stars in 1994 and were signed to the label Disquébec. In its five years of existence, the band released two albums. The single "Shake Your Fire Maker" released on their album 13 found great success on Quebec radio stations. Disquébec shut down operations in 1997 and the band continued for a while announcing it is disbanding in 1999 after a farewell concert at the cabaret du Musée Juste pour rire.

Solo
Yann Perreau continued his career and played the marionette in youth theatre show Les quatre saisons de Picot by Gilles Vigneault for 4 seasons. He also appeared in various events in Quebec and France through a tour organised by the Office franco-québécois pour la jeunesse. Returning to Québec, he appeared in the music festival Coup de cœur francophone 2001 and cooperated with the musician Gilles Brisebois. In Peru he worked with the theatre group Vichama, and composed the soundtrack for Casa Loma: journal de bord.

His debut solo album Western Romance released in November 2002 with the label FouleSpin Musique contained songs co-written with Fredric Gary Comeau. He appeared in a number of festivals, won the award Rapsat-Lelièvre at the Francofolies de Spa in Belgium, the award Miroir de l'artiste d'ici at the Festival d'été de Québec and Prix Félix-Leclerc de la chanson 2003 at the FrancoFolies de Montréal making in 2004 to the closing concert event at the FrancoFolies.

His second album Nucléaire was in April 2005 with two singles "La vie n'est pas qu'une salope" and "Guerrière" receiving airplay and in the same year was invited on the "Carte Blanche" show by Alain Bashung at the FrancoFolies de Montréal. In 2006, he won the Bourse Rideau.

In 2007, he returned to the stage with the show Perreau et la Lune It was later released as a DVD Perreau et la lune live au Quat'Sous by Bonsound Records. His album Un serpent sous les fleurs released by Bonsound Records in 2009 was nominated for Best francophone album during the 2010 Juno Awards, the Canadian equivalent of the Grammies.

Discography

Albums
2002: Western Romance [FouleSpin]
2005: Nucléaire [FouleSpin]
2009: Un serpent sous les fleurs [Bonsound]
2012: À genoux dans le désir [Productions du Renard]
2016: Le Fantastique des Astres [Bonsound]

DVDs
2008: Perreau et la lune live au Quat'Sous'' [Bonsound]

Videography
Songs
2002: "Fille d'automne"
2003: "L'amour est une bombe"
2003: "Ma dope à moi"
2005: "La vie n'est pas qu'une salope"
2006: "Guerrière"
2009: "Beau comme on s'aime"
2009: "Le président danse autrement"
2010: "L'amour se meurt"
2011: "Le bruit des bottes" 
2016: "J'aime les oiseaux"
2016: "Faut pas se fier aux apparences"

References

External links
Official website

1976 births
Canadian songwriters
French-language singers of Canada
Living people
21st-century Canadian male singers